Mowbray Park ferry wharf is located on the southern side of the Brisbane River serving the Brisbane suburb of East Brisbane in Queensland, Australia. It is served by RiverCity Ferries' CityCat services.

History 
Mowbray Park is named for Thomas Mowbray, a presbyterian minister who had been minister at the now heritage-listed Mowbraytown Presbyterian Church in the East Brisbane area (and formerly of the Blackridge Parish Church, Scotland).

The wharf sustained moderate damage during the January 2011 Brisbane floods. It reopened after repairs on 14 February 2011.

References

External links

East Brisbane, Queensland
Ferry wharves in Brisbane